Josefina Rübenacker (born 26 August 2000) is an Argentinian field hockey player.

Hockey career 
In 2019, Rübenacker was called into the senior national women's team. 

She won a gold medal at the 2018 Youth Olympics in Buenos Aires.

References

Living people
2000 births
Argentine female field hockey players
Field hockey players at the 2018 Summer Youth Olympics
Youth Olympic gold medalists for Argentina
Sportspeople from Córdoba, Argentina
Argentine people of German descent